Mai Ezz Eldin (born 19 January 1980 in Abu Dhabi) is an Egyptian actress. She has acted in many films and series such as Love Journey in 2001, Bent benout in 2006, Ayathon in 2006, Omar & Salma in 2007, and Kheit harir in 2020.

Early life
She was born in Abu Dhabi to a Muslim father and Christian mother. She lived there for four years before going to Egypt. She lived in Alexandria where she completed studying. She graduated in sociology from Alexandria University.

Career
Her first role was the 2001 film Love Journey with Mohamed Fouad which brought her fame. She also has many comedy roles such as Ayathon in 2006, Shikamara in 2007, Omar & Salma in 2007, Omar & Salma 2 in 2009, Omar & Salma 3 in 2012 and Game Over in 2012. She also has many famous roles in series such as Where is My Heart in 2002 with Yousra, The Truth and Mirage in 2003 with Fifi Abdou and Yousuf Shaaban, Interview on Live in 2004, Bent Benout in 2006, Adam in 2011 with Tamer Hosny, The Suspicion in 2013, Dalaa Albanat in 2014 with Kinda Alloush, Letters in 2018 for which she received the best actress award from Der guest magazine, Princess Beesa in 2019.

Personal life
She is single and unmarried. She was formerly engaged to Egyptian footballer Mohamed Zidan but split in 2009. She has stated that while her mother is Christian, she was raised to believe in Islam.

Filmography

Films

TV series

References

External links
 Mayy Izzuddin in IMDb

1980 births
Living people
21st-century Egyptian actresses
Egyptian film actresses
Egyptian television actresses
Alexandria University alumni
People from Alexandria
People from the Emirate of Abu Dhabi
Egyptian Muslims
Egyptian comedians